Kolanı or Kelany or Kolany or Kelan’ may refer to:
Kolanı, Hajigabul, Azerbaijan
Kolanı, Nakhchivan, Azerbaijan
Kolanı, Salyan, Azerbaijan
Kolanı, Siazan, Azerbaijan
Kolanı, Yevlakh, Azerbaijan